Paapam Cheyyathavar Kalleriyatte is a 2020 Indian Malayalam-language satirical film written and directed by Shambhu Purushothaman, produced by Sanju S. Unnithan. The film features an ensemble cast of Vinay Forrt, Tini Tom, Srinda Arhaan, Santhy Balachandran, Arun Kurian, Anumol, James Elias, Alencier Ley Lopez and Anil Nedumangad. The music was composed by Prashant Pillai and background score of the film was done by Dawn Vincent. The film was Shambhu Purushothaman's second attempt after Vedivazhipadu.

Plot 
Christians believe that marriages are made in heaven. It is a satirical take on the belief, which is reinforced through marriage rituals, about the Christian marriage and the reality of it as seen around us.
The title of the movie is an allusion to an utterance of Jesus in John 8:7, He that is without sin among you, let him first cast a stone at her. 

Paapam Cheyyathavar Kalleriyatte begins with discussions between two seemingly rich and affluent Christian families. The conversations in the background distinctly show an arranged marriage being fixed and moves on to the topic of dowry. Rohan, who is said to have secured a prospective career at Google in the US, is set to marry Linda. Their families have arranged the alliance and Linda’s parents have offered  as dowry. The groom's family forbids Rohan from communicating with Linda before marriage, and the couple hardly meet. Rohan's brother Roy is in a financial crisis and sees the marriage as the solution. But on the day of the betrothal, things take a turn for the worse when both families discover certain secrets.

Cast 

 Vinay Forrt as Roy
 Santhy Balachandran as Linda
 Arun Kurian as Rohan
 Tini Tom as Alex
 Sunil Sukhada as Varghese Mathen a.k.a. Varkichen
 Anumol K. Manoharan as Lissy
 Srinda Arhaan as Susan Roy
 Alencier Ley Lopez as Xavier
 Ambika Mohan as Marykutty
 Anil Nedumangad as Rajan
 James Eliya as Umman Koshy
 Madhupal as George
 Neena Kurup as Jancy
 Kochu Preman as Mathachan
 Narayanankutty as Sebastian
 Parvathi T. as Grace Amma
 Yavanika Gopalakrishnan as Ouseph
 Baby Sameksha
 Sameksha Nair
 Roshna Ann Roy as Angel
 Kottayam Pradeep
 Bobby Mohan as Michael
 Balaji Sharma
 Chekuthan
 Ambika Rao as Philomina
 Jolly Chirayath as Linda's mother
 Shiny T. Rajan
 Reshmi Anil
 Vishnu V Nair – Video archive from Pournami Thinkal
 Gauri Krishnan – Video archive from Pournami Thinkal

Soundtrack 
The songs in film were composed by Prashant Pillai and background score was done by Dawn Vincent.

Release 
The film was released on 21 February 2020. Streamed on Amazon Prime Video.

References

External links 
 

2020 films
Indian satirical films
2020s Malayalam-language films
Indian comedy films
2020 comedy films